Xylotrechus insignis is a species of beetle in the family Cerambycidae. It was described by John Lawrence LeConte in 1873. Xylotrechus insignis is commonly referred to as a willow borer which means that it drills into trees usually killing or harming the tree. Xylotrechus insignis lives mainly in trees and especially willows; mainly in North America. They get to be about 12 to 16 mm long

References

Xylotrechus
Beetles described in 1873